Hot Package is an Adult Swim entertainment variety show, created by Derrick Beckles. The show parodies network entertainment shows such as Entertainment Tonight and Access Hollywood. Instead of sourcing its news from real celebrities, TV shows, and films, all of Hot Package's "entertainment" news comes from found footage, including clips from forgotten B films and bizarre TV shows. The show is hosted by Derrick Beckles, Pat O'Brien, Anastasia Roark, and Mark McGrath, and features colorful guests, makeovers, and interview segments. Hot Package, produced by Abso Lutely Productions, Abominable Pictures, TV Carnage, and Williams Street, premiered on October 4, 2013, and has currently aired eleven episodes. On May 9, 2014, Adult Swim confirmed that Hot Package would be returning for a second season.

The second season of Hot Package premiered on February 27, 2015. Special guest stars include: Mark McGrath, celebrity stalker Jeff Deane Turner, paperback hunk Fabio, ex-Hollywood madam Heidi Fleiss, and cult filmmaker Kenneth Anger.

Segments
The show features a wide variety of segments parodying those found in entertainment news shows. Some of these segments include:

HP Exclusive – Fake entertainment news based on an out-of-context film, TV, or found footage clip.
Ones on One – Derrick interviews an obscure figure from film or television as if he/she were a celebrity guest. 
Hollywood Makeover – Derrick gives someone a makeover based on a "Hollywood hunk" from an obscure film/TV clip (such as Jon McBride in Cannibal Campout). Despite a wide number of film sources being used as inspiration, from action B-movies to LSD scare films, the makeovers largely turn out the same each time, usually with no reference to the film in question. 
Countdowns – A list of themed film clips.
Curtain Raiser – Movie reviews. Again, the movie is always obscure, but treated like a recent Hollywood film.
Bloopers – Embarrassing found footage.

Hot Package episodes

References
Notes

Sources
Jefferies, Adrianne. "Adult Swim shows Comic-Con its weird new 'Hot Package'" on The Verge. (July 20, 2013)
Lynn, Steve. "Hot Package at Comic Con on I Heart Comix (July 25, 2013)

External links

Official Facebook page

2013 American television series debuts
2015 American television series endings
2010s American late-night television series
2010s American parody television series
2010s American variety television series
Adult Swim original programming
American news parodies
2010s American video clip television series
English-language television shows
Television series by Abso Lutely Productions
Television series by Williams Street